Patilah Omoto (born 2 March 1995) is a Kenyan international footballer who plays for Kariobangi Sharks, as a midfielder.

Career
He has played club football for Kariobangi Sharks, A.F.C. Leopards and Bandari.

He made his international debut for Kenya in 2012.

References

1995 births
Living people
Kenyan footballers
Kenya international footballers
F.C. Kariobangi Sharks players
A.F.C. Leopards players
Bandari F.C. (Kenya) players
Kenyan Premier League players
Association football midfielders